The Dabong railway station is a Malaysian railway station at and named after the town of Dabong, Kuala Krai District, Kelantan, Malaysia. It is a terminus for Shuttle Timur that runs between Tumpat and Dabong.

Train services
 Ekspres Rakyat Timuran 26/27 Tumpat–JB Sentral
 Shuttle Timur 51/52/57/60 Tumpat–Gua Musang
 Shuttle Timur 55/56 Tumpat–Dabong

See also
 Rail transport in Malaysia

KTM East Coast Line stations
Kuala Krai District
Railway stations in Kelantan